There are at least 191 members of the Rosales order found in Montana. Some of these species are exotics (not native to Montana) and some species have been designated as Species of Concern.

Currants and gooseberries
Family: Grossulariaceae

Ribes americanum, wild black currant
Ribes aureum, golden currant
Ribes cereum, wax currant
Ribes hudsonianum, northern black currant
Ribes inerme, white-stem gooseberry
Ribes lacustre, bristly black currant
Ribes laxiflorum, trailing black currant
Ribes montigenum, alpine prickly gooseberry
Ribes oxyacanthoides, Canada gooseberry
Ribes oxyacanthoides subsp. hendersonii, Henderson's gooseberry
Ribes oxyacanthoides subsp. irriguum, Idaho gooseberry
Ribes oxyacanthoides subsp. setosum, bristly gooseberry
Ribes rubrum, northern red currant
Ribes triste, swamp red currant
Ribes viscosissimum, sticky currant

Greasebush
Family: Crossosomataceae
Glossopetalon spinescens, spiny greasebush

Hydrangea

Family: Hydrangeaceae
Philadelphus lewisii, Lewis' mock orange

Rose

Family: Rosaceae

Agrimonia gryposepala, tall hairy groovebur
Agrimonia striata, woodland agrimony
Alchemilla xanthochlora, common lady's-mantle
Amelanchier alnifolia, Saskatoon serviceberry
Amelanchier utahensis, Utah serviceberry
Argentina anserina, silverweed cinquefoil
Cercocarpus ledifolius, curl-leaf mountain-mahogany
Cercocarpus montanus, alderleaf mountain-mahogany
Chamaerhodos erecta, rose chamaerhodos
Comarum palustre, marsh cinquefoil
Crataegus castlegarensis, Castlegar hawthorn
Crataegus chrysocarpa, fineberry hawthorn
Crataegus douglasii, Douglas's hawthorn
Crataegus macracantha, fleshy hawthorn
Crataegus monogyna, English hawthorn
Crataegus okanaganensis, Okanagan Valley hawthorn
Crataegus okennonii, O'Kennon's hawthorn
Crataegus phippsii, Phipps' hawthorn
Crataegus suksdorfii, Suksdorf's hawthorn
Crataegus williamsii, Williams' hawthorn
Dryas drummondii, yellow mountain-avens
Dryas integrifolia, entire-leaved avens
Dryas octopetala, eight-petal mountain-avens
Fragaria vesca, woodland strawberry
Fragaria virginiana, Virginia strawberry
Fragaria virginiana subsp. glauca
Fragaria virginiana var. platypetala
Geum aleppicum, yellow avens
Geum canadense, white avens
Geum macrophyllum, largeleaf avens
Geum rivale, purple avens
Geum rossii, Ross avens
Geum rossii var. rossii, Ross avens
Geum rossii var. turbinatum, slender-stemmed avens
Geum triflorum, prairie-smoke
Holodiscus discolor, cream-bush oceanspray
Horkelia fusca, pine woods horkelia
Ivesia gordonii, Gordon's ivesia
Ivesia tweedyi, Tweedy's ivesia
Kelseya uniflora, one-flower kelseya
Luetkea pectinata, segmented luetkea
Malus sylvestris, common crabapple
Petrophytum caespitosum, caespitose rockmat
Physocarpus malvaceus, mallow-leaf ninebark
Physocarpus monogynus, mountain ninebark
Potentilla argentea, silvery cinquefoil
Potentilla arguta, tall cinquefoil
Potentilla biennis, biennial cinquefoil
Potentilla bipinnatifida, tansy cinquefoil
Potentilla brevifolia, short-leaved cinquefoil
Potentilla concinna, elegant cinquefoil
Potentilla diversifolia, diverse-leaf cinquefoil
Potentilla drummondii, Drummond's cinquefoil
Potentilla fissa, big-flower cinquefoil
Potentilla flabellifolia, fan-leaf cinquefoil
Potentilla fruticosa, shrubby cinquefoil
Potentilla glandulosa, sticky cinquefoil
Potentilla gracilis var. flabelliformis, slender cinquefoil
Potentilla gracilis var. pulcherrima, soft cinquefoil
Potentilla gracilis, fanleaf cinquefoil
Potentilla hippiana, horse cinquefoil
Potentilla hookeriana, Hooker's cinquefoil
Potentilla hyparctica, low arctic cinquefoil
Potentilla macounii, Macoun's cinquefoil
Potentilla multisecta, featherleaf cinquefoil
Potentilla nivea, snow cinquefoil
Potentilla nivea var. pentaphylla, five-leaf cinquefoil
Potentilla norvegica, Norwegian cinquefoil
Potentilla ovina, sheep cinquefoil
Potentilla paradoxa, bushy cinquefoil
Potentilla pensylvanica, Pennsylvania cinquefoil
Potentilla plattensis, Platte cinquefoil
Potentilla recta, sulphur cinquefoil
Potentilla rivalis, brook cinquefoil
Potentilla rubricaulis, Rocky Mountain cinquefoil
Potentilla uniflora, one-flowered cinquefoil
Prunus americana, American plum
Prunus cerasus, sour cherry
Prunus emarginata, bitter cherry
Prunus mahaleb, mahaleb cherry
Prunus pensylvanica, pin cherry
Prunus pumila, sand cherry
Prunus virginiana, chokecherry
Purshia tridentata, antelope bitterbrush
Rosa acicularis, prickly rose
Rosa arkansana, prairie rose
Rosa blanda, smooth rose
Rosa gymnocarpa, baldhip rose
Rosa nutkana, Nootka rose
Rosa woodsii, Woods' rose
Rubus arcticus, nagoonberry
Rubus discolor, Himalayan blackberry
Rubus idaeus, red raspberry
Rubus idaeus subsp. idaeus, American red raspberry
Rubus idaeus subsp. strigosus, grayleaf red raspberry
Rubus laciniatus, evergreen blackberry
Rubus leucodermis, white-stemmed raspberry
Rubus parviflorus, thimbleberry
Rubus pedatus, five-leaf dwarf bramble
Rubus pubescens, dwarf red raspberry
Rubus ursinus, Pacific blackberry
Sanguisorba annua, prairie burnet
Sanguisorba minor, salad burnet
Sibbaldia procumbens, creeping sibbaldia
Sorbus aucuparia, European mountain-ash
Sorbus scopulina, greene's mountain-ash
Sorbus sitchensis, Sitka mountain-ash
Spiraea betulifolia, white spirea
Spiraea douglasii, Douglas spiraea
Spiraea splendens, rose meadowsweet
Spiraea × pyramidata, pyramidal spiraea
Waldsteinia idahoensis, Idaho barren strawberry

Saxifrage

Family: Saxifragaceae

Boykinia major, mountain boykinia
Chrysosplenium tetrandrum, northern golden-carpet
Conimitella williamsii, William's conimitella
Heuchera cylindrica, poker alumroot
Heuchera cylindrica var. cylindrica, poker alumroot
Heuchera cylindrica var. glabella, beautiful alumroot
Heuchera grossulariifolia, gooseberry-leaf alumroot
Heuchera parvifolia, littleleaf alumroot
Heuchera richardsonii, Richardson's alumroot
Leptarrhena pyrolifolia, leather-leaf saxifrage
Lithophragma glabrum, bulbous woodland-star
Lithophragma parviflorum, small-flower woodland-star
Lithophragma tenellum, slender woodland-star
Micranthes apetala, tiny swamp saxifrage
Micranthes ferruginea, rusty-hair saxifrage
Micranthes idahoensis, Idaho saxifrage
Micranthes lyallii, red-stemmed saxifrage
Micranthes nidifica, peak saxifrage
Micranthes nivalis, alpine saxifrage
Micranthes occidentalis, western saxifrage
Micranthes odontoloma, streambank saxifrage
Micranthes oregana, bog saxifrage
Micranthes rhomboidea, diamondleaf saxifrage
Micranthes subapetala, Yellowstone saxifrage
Micranthes tempestiva, storm saxifrage
Mitella breweri, feathery mitrewort
Mitella caulescens, creeping mitrewort
Mitella nuda, naked mitrewort
Mitella pentandra, fivestamen mitrewort
Mitella stauropetala, side-flower mitrewort
Mitella trifida, Pacific mitrewort
Parnassia fimbriata, fringed grass-of-parnassus
Parnassia kotzebuei, Kotzebue's grass-of-parnassus
Parnassia palustris, marsh grass-of-parnassus
Parnassia palustris var. montanensis, mountain grass-of-parnassus
Parnassia palustris var. parviflora, smallflower grass-of-parnassus
Saxifraga adscendens, ascending saxifrage
Saxifraga bronchialis, matte saxifrage
Saxifraga cernua, nodding saxifrage
Saxifraga cespitosa, tufted saxifrage
Saxifraga chrysantha, golden saxifrage
Saxifraga flagellaris, spider saxifrage
Saxifraga hirculus, yellow marsh saxifrage
Saxifraga hyperborea, pygmy saxifrage
Saxifraga mertensiana, Mertens' saxifrage
Saxifraga oppositifolia, purple mountain saxifrage
Saxifraga rivularis, alpine brook saxifrage
Saxifraga tolmiei, Tolmie saxifrage
Suksdorfia ranunculifolia, buttercup-leaf suksdorfia
Suksdorfia violacea, violet suksdorfia
Sullivantia hapemanii, Wyoming sullivantia
Telesonix heucheriformis, false saxifrage
Tellima grandiflora, large fringe-cup
Tiarella trifoliata, lace foam-flower

Stonecrops

Family: Crassulaceae
Sedum acre, gold-moss
Sedum debile, weak-stemmed stonecrop
Sedum integrifolium, entire-leaf stonecrop
Sedum lanceolatum, lanceleaf stonecrop
Sedum leibergii, Borsch's stonecrop
Sedum rhodanthum, red-pod stonecrop
Sedum stenopetalum, narrow-petal stonecrop
Tillaea aquatica, water pigmy-weed

Further reading

See also
 List of dicotyledons of Montana

Notes

Montana
Montana